The Torneio de Integração da Amazônia was a football competition organized by the Brazilian Football Confederation with the intention to  integrate the Amazonian region and to develop the football in the region.

Format
In 2003, the eight participating clubs were divided in the first stage in two groups of four teams each, the winner of each group played the final. All stages of the competition were played in single-legged games.

List of champions

Statistics

Titles by team

Titles by state

References

External links
RSSSF Brasil

Defunct football competitions in Brazil